James Carl "Jim" Bean is an American college administrator from Oregon. He is the current provost and senior vice president for academic affairs at Northeastern University in Boston, Massachusetts. He previously served as Senior Associate Dean for Academic Programs at the Lundquist College of Business, and also Senior Vice President and Provost at the University of Oregon.

Career
Bean was previously the dean of the Lundquist College of Business at the University of Oregon where he served as the Harry B. Miller Professor of Business. Additionally, he served as an administrator for 24 years at the University of Michigan. He served as the associate dean for graduate education and international programs in the College of Engineering, and associate dean for academic affairs. In addition to his duties as provost, he is a member of the board of trustees at Harvey Mudd College. 

Bean was previously president of the Institute for Operations Research and the Management Sciences. He remains a charter fellow of the institute.

Education

Ph.D., Operations Research, Stanford University, 1980
M.S., Operations Research, Stanford University, 1979
B.S., Mathematics, Harvey Mudd College, 1977

References

External links
 
 

Harvey Mudd College alumni
Stanford University alumni
Living people
University of Oregon people
Year of birth missing (living people)
University of Michigan staff
Fellows of the Institute for Operations Research and the Management Sciences